Another Day in Paradise is the ninth mixtape by Palestinian-Canadian hip hop recording artist Belly. It was released on May 27, 2016, by Roc Nation and XO. The mixtape features guest appearances from Waka Flocka Flame, Lil Wayne, Juicy J, Starrah, Kehlani, B-Real and Travis Scott.

Background 

Belly has stated in an interview with Billboard that his music is all about progress - "I feel like it took me a lifetime to gain the experience and the knowledge that I needed to put the project together, you know what I mean? But all my projects are ongoing. I'm halfway through the album right now, I just put this out, I've got another short mixtape I'm working on on the side." When describing the concept behind the project, he states that "People think of paradise as sunlight, palm trees and beaches. For me, paradise is all the hell I had to go through to get here. And every time I look at all this beautiful scenery, that's the first thing I think about. That's what I compare it to. And that's my paradise. That's kind of the concept behind the project.

Singles 

The first single, "Zanzibar" was released February 3, 2016. It features guest vocals from American rapper Juicy J. The music video was released May 18, 2016. 

The second single "You", features guest vocals from American singer Kehlani. The music video was released August 26, 2016.

The third single "Ballerina". The music video was released October 27, 2016. The official remix featuring Ty Dolla $ign was released November 18, 2016.

Other songs 

The first promotional song is "Money Go", it was released November 24, 2015, and features vocals from Travis Scott. The music video was released May 27, 2017.

The second promotional song is "It's All Love", it featured vocals from Starrah, and uncredited vocals from The Weeknd. The accompanying music video was released July 18, 2016.

Track listing 
Credits were adapted from Tidal.

Track notes
  signifies a co-producer.
  signifies an additional producer.

Sample notes
 "It's All Love" contains an interpolation of "Lost Ones", performed by Lauryn Hill.
 "You" contains a sample of "Things Done Changed", performed by The Notorious B.I.G.

Personnel
Credits were adapted from Tidal.

Performers
 Belly – primary artist
 Starrah – featured artist 
 Travis Scott – featured artist 
 Waka Flocka Flame – featured artist 
 Kehlani – featured artist 
 Lil Wayne – featured artist 
 Juicy J – featured artist 
 B-Real – featured artist 

Technical
 Jason Quenneville – recording engineer , mixing engineer 
 Faris Al-Majed – recording engineer 
 Raphael Mesquita – assistant recording engineer , recording engineer 
 Tony Maserati – mixing engineer 
 Chris Athens – mastering engineer 
 Dave Huffman – mastering engineer 
 Josh Smith – recording engineer 
 Manny Marroquin – mixing engineer 
 Chris Galland – mixing engineer 
 Jeff Jackson – assistant recording engineer 
 Robin Florent – assistant recording engineer 
 Danny Schofield – mixing engineer 
 Benjamin Diehl – mixing engineer 
 Fabian Marasciullo – mixing engineer 
 McCoy Socalgargoyle – mixing engineer 
 Crazy Mike – recording engineer 

Production
 The ANMLS – producer 
 DannyBoyStyles – co-producer , producer 
 DaHeala – co-producer 
 Infamous – co-producer 
 Velous – producer 
 Ben Billions – producer 
 Krack Keys – additional producer 
 Honorable C.N.O.T.E. – producer

References

2016 mixtape albums
Albums produced by Honorable C.N.O.T.E.